Protaphreutis is a genus of moths belonging to the family Tineidae.

Species
Protaphreutis antipyla Meyrick, 1930
Protaphreutis acquisitella (Walker, 1863)
Protaphreutis borboniella (Boisduval, 1833)
Protaphreutis brasmatias Meyrick, 1930
Protaphreutis cubitalis (Meyrick, 1910)
Protaphreutis leucopsamma Meyrick, 1930
Protaphreutis sauroderma Meyrick, 1930

References

De Prins, J. & De Prins, W. 2016. Afromoths, online database of Afrotropical moth species (Lepidoptera). World Wide Web electronic publication (www.afromoths.net) (acc.30-Dec-2016)

Tineidae
Tineidae genera
Taxa named by Edward Meyrick